Poronaysky District is an administrative district (raion) of Sakhalin Oblast, Russia; one of the seventeen in the oblast. As a municipal division, it is incorporated as Poronaysky Urban Okrug. It is located in the eastern central part of the Island of Sakhalin. Its administrative center is the town of Poronaysk. Population (excluding the administrative center):

Geography

References

Notes

Sources

Districts of Sakhalin Oblast